David Lawrence Whitmore (born July 6, 1967 in Daingerfield, Texas) is a former American football safety in the National Football League for the New York Giants, the San Francisco 49ers, the Kansas City Chiefs, and the Philadelphia Eagles.  He played college football at Stephen F. Austin State University and was drafted in the fourth round of the 1990 NFL Draft.

References

1967 births
Living people
People from Daingerfield, Texas
American football safeties
Stephen F. Austin Lumberjacks football players
New York Giants players
San Francisco 49ers players
Kansas City Chiefs players
Philadelphia Eagles players